Dawn Hudson (born January 4, 1956) is an American actress and movie executive. She served as the former chief executive officer of the Academy of Motion Picture Arts and Sciences from 2011 to 2022. She was succeeded by current chief executive officer Bill Kramer in June 2022.

Early life
Dawn Hudson was born in 1956 in Hot Springs, Arkansas. She attended Harvard University, but took a hiatus to work for Democratic Senator John Little McClellan in Washington, D.C., until she returned to college and graduated. She attended graduate school at the Washington University in St. Louis and the Grenoble Institute of Political Studies in Grenoble, France.

Career
Hudson served as the Executive Director of Film Independent, where she produced the Spirit Awards and the Los Angeles Film Festival.

Hudson served as the chief executive officer of the Academy of Motion Picture Arts and Sciences from 2011 until 2022. She was succeeded by current chief executive officer Bill Kramer in June 2022. In 2015, she suggested that the new Academy membership rules were not a matter of political correctness. Hudson is a board member of the Academy Museum of Motion Pictures.

References

External links

Living people
1950s births
Actors from Hot Springs, Arkansas
People from Los Angeles
Harvard University alumni
Washington University in St. Louis alumni
Academy of Motion Picture Arts and Sciences
American women chief executives